Pinagong is a dense bread roll from the Philippines made with all-purpose flour, milk, and salt. It is a variant of pan de monja (monáy) distinguished primarily by its shape and the more complex pattern of scoring on top. The name means "made into a turtle", from Tagalog pagong ("turtle").

See also
Putok
Pandesal
 List of bread rolls

References 

Philippine breads
Yeast breads
Southeast Asian breads